Nanton  is one of the constituencies represented in the Parliament of Ghana. It elects one Member of Parliament (MP) by the first past the post system of election. It is located in the Northern Region of Ghana. he current member of Parliament for the constituency is Alhaji Abdul-Kareem. He was elected on the ticket of the New Patriotic Party (NPP) and  won a majority of 691  votes more than candidate closest in the race, to win the constituency election to become the MP. He succeeded Alhaji Alhassan Yakubu who had represented the constituency in the 4th Republican parliament on the ticket of the National Democratic Congress.
Ibrahim Mohammed Murtala is the NDC parliamentary candidate for the 2012 elections in the Nanton Constituency. He has been tipped by many to win the seat in the elections.

See also
List of Ghana Parliament constituencies

References 

Parliamentary constituencies in the Northern Region (Ghana)